Piotr Jarosław Świerczewski (born 8 April 1972) is a Polish former professional footballer who played as a midfielder. During his 20-year professional career, he played for clubs such as Lech Poznań, GKS Katowice, AS Saint-Étienne (France), SC Bastia (France), Gamba Osaka (Japan), Olympique de Marseille (France), Birmingham City F.C. (England), Polonia Warsaw and ŁKS Łódź. His older brother Marek is also a former footballer.

Club career
In 1993, Świerczewski signed for French side Saint-Étienne after trialing for 1. FC Nürnberg in Germany.

International career
Świerczewski played for the Poland national team, winning 70 caps and scoring a goal. He was a participant at the 1992 Summer Olympics, where Poland won the silver medal and at the 2002 FIFA World Cup.

Personal life
Świerczewski is married to Lidia and now works for the Polish bus company Stalko.

His older brother Marek is also a former footballer and Poland international.

In 1993, he shared the cover of FIFA International Soccer with David Platt, in the first game in this videogame series.

Career statistics

Club

International

Scores and results list Poland's goal tally first, score column indicates score after Świerczewski goal.

References

External links
 
 
 

1972 births
Living people
Sportspeople from Nowy Sącz
Association football midfielders
Polish footballers
Olympic footballers of Poland
Olympic silver medalists for Poland
GKS Katowice players
Sandecja Nowy Sącz players
AS Saint-Étienne players
Expatriate footballers in France
SC Bastia players
Olympique de Marseille players
Ligue 1 players
Expatriate footballers in England
Birmingham City F.C. players
Lech Poznań players
MKS Cracovia (football) players
Footballers at the 1992 Summer Olympics
Poland international footballers
Expatriate footballers in Japan
Gamba Osaka players
Dyskobolia Grodzisk Wielkopolski players
2002 FIFA World Cup players
Premier League players
J1 League players
Polish expatriate footballers
Ekstraklasa players
Olympic medalists in football
Motor Lublin managers
Znicz Pruszków managers
Medalists at the 1992 Summer Olympics
Polish football managers